Svetlana Yuryevna Leshukova (born 7 June 1974) is a Russian retired swimmer who won two bronze medals in the 4×100 m freestyle relay at the European championships in 1993 and 1997. She competed in the same event at the 1992 Summer Olympics as a member of the Unified Team, finishing fourth. She also competed in the 1996 Summer Olympics representing Russia.  In 1997, she graduated from Ural State University in Yekaterinburg.

After marriage she changed her last name to Sosnovskaya.

References

1974 births
Living people
Swimmers at the 1992 Summer Olympics
Swimmers at the 1996 Summer Olympics
Olympic swimmers of the Unified Team
Olympic swimmers of Russia
Russian female freestyle swimmers
European Aquatics Championships medalists in swimming
Ural State University alumni
Sportspeople from Sverdlovsk Oblast